Duilio Forte (5 November 1967) is a Swedish-Italian artist and architect. He works primarily with wood and iron, creating large sculptures and unique exterior sculptural saunas. He teaches at the Nuova Accademia Belle Arti di Milano and other institutions in Italy.

Early life 
Forte was born in Milan in 1967 and is half Italian, and half Swedish. His Italian father, Ettore Forte, was a surgeon and his Swedish mother was a housewife.

He studied architecture at Polytechnic University of Milan, graduating in 1994. In 1994, he won the first prize in the San Carlo Borromeo at La Permanente of Milan with the Ekeberg Sauna, constructed in Sweden.

Career
After college, Forte continued designing and building outdoor saunas, with each being a unique architectural design. On March 13, 1998, Forte founded AtelierFORTE, an architecture and sculpture research laboratory. AtelierFORTE specializes in unique outdoor saunas and other architectural installations. Its structures are designed according to Forte's ArkiZoic Manifesto, written in 2009 on the anniversary of the birth of Charles Darwin. The manifesto defines his style which is characterized by a union of architecture and the geologic periods. It includes eight points: method, evolution, mathematics, representation, structure, symmetry, materials, and decoration.

Since 2003, Forte has organized and taught StugaProject, an annual art and architecture workshop near the town of Grythyttan in Sweden. He also teaches materials technologies at Nuova Accademia Belle Arti di Milano in Milan, Italy.

In 2008, Forte participated in the 11th International Architecture Exhibition of Venice, creating the installation Sleipnir Venexia. In 2010, he was again invited to participate in the International Architecture Exhibition of Venice and created the installation Sleipnir Convivalis. Forte also participated in the XXI Triennale International Exhibition of Milan in 2016 with his zoomorphic work URSUS.

Curator Beppe Finessi described Forte's process: "His whole life is a workshop. He is the veritable 'Craftsman' of the Italian architecture, both designer and builder. He doesn't need to talk to the workers or constantly see what they are doing. He does everything himself. His pencil is a saw, his AutoCAD is a welder. He makes everything he needs with his own hands, partly because it would be very difficult to explain to anyone else what's going on inside his complicated, visionary, fantastic head."

Forte became a member of the Swedish Association of Architects in 2005 and was nominated for the Yakov Chernikhov International Prize for young architects in 2010.

Personal life 
Forte lives in Milan a former textile factory that he purchased in 1998. The  building is more than 100 years old. His brother, Lucio, is an artist who lives in an adjacent factory building.

Exhibitions 

 2007 – Hugin e Munin, exhibition, Milan, Italy
 2008 – Sleipnir BASTU opera, exhibition, AtelierFORTE, Milan, Italy
 2008 – Yggdrasill Steneby opera, exhibition, Dåls Långed, Sweden
 2009 – Encelado, exhibition, Gran Salone dei Planisferi, Milan, Italy
 2009 – Arkizoic OBSESSIO, exhibition, Fortezza da Basso, Florence, Italy
 2009 December – Sideropithecus Fortis, Affetti da cretinismo – Celebrating Cesare Lombroso exhibition, Milan, Italy
 2010  April – Ars Combinatoria – exhibition, SpazioRT, Milan, Italy
 2010 April – OSPITI INASPETTATI. Case di ieri, design di oggi, exhibition at Casa Boschi di Stefano, Milan, Italy
 2010 May – WOOD 2010, exhibition at Virserum Art Museum
 2010 July – Sleipnir Albus exhibition at Galleria Il Frantoio, Capalbio, Tuscany, Italy
 2010 August – Sleipnir Convivalis Quintus, exhibition AILATI, Biennale di Venezia, Venice, Italy
 2010 September – Fafnir, exhibition IL TESORO DI BOMISA, Triennale di Milano, Milan, Italy
 2013 – The Centuries Long Detail – Collective exhibit, Cheongju International Craft Biennale, South Korea
 2013 – Semi-Equi – double solo exhibit, GAM Galleria d'arte moderna Genova Nervi, Genoa, Italy
 2014 – Sleipnir XXXIII – temporary installation, Triennale di Milano exhibition, Milan, Italy
 2016 – URSUS – temporary installation – XXI Triennale, Triennale di Milano exhibition, Milan, Italy
 2019 – ArkiZoic Project III 55249 – solo exhibition, Francesco Zanuso Gallery, Milan, Italy
 2022 – ArkiZoic Project XI 66301  – solo exhibition, iKonica Art Gallery, Milan, Italy

Works 

 1994 – Ekeberg sauna, Sweden
 2006 – Spiv, opera  – StugaProject2006, Grythyttan, Sweden
 2006 – Taenaris, opera  – Milan, Italy
 2007 – Spiken, opera  – StugaProject2007, Grythyttan, Sweden
 2008 – Sleipnir TAVRINORVM opera – arsenale Cavalli, Turin, Italy
 2008 – Sleipnir VENEXIA, XI  – Biennale di architettura, Venice, Italy
 2008 – JulBock NABA, opera, Nuova Accademia di Belle Arti, Milan, Italy
 2008 – Sleipnir Spiken
 2009 – Fenrir, opera  – Milan, Italy
 2009 February  – Foundation of ArkiZoic, Milan, Italy
 2009 – Pliosaurus, Milan, Italy
 2009 – Sleipnir Nuncius – Vittoriale degli Italiani, Gardone Riviera, Italy
 2009 September – Drakkar Yggdrasill – Grythyttan, Sweden
 2010 March – Birnam Wood – Piazza Sempione, 616 Fifth Avenue, New York City, New York, U.S.
 2010 April – Sleipnir Trebuchet – Triennale Bovisa, Milan, Italy
 2010 August – Sleipnir Ratatoskr – Grythyttan, Sweden
 2011 January – Sleipnir Biologiska – Biologiska Museet (Biological Museum), Stockholm, Sweden
 2011 February – La Foresta di Sleipnir – Rotonda della Besana, Milan, Italy
 2011 April – Mammuthus Belli sculpture sauna
 2011 September – Sleipnir Ex Silva – Polytechnic University of Milan, Milan, Italy
 2011 November – Phoenix Turris, Turin, Italy
 2011 – Asgard Turris Venti 829 Sculpture
 2011 – Asgard Turris sculpture
 2011 – Phoenix sculpture
 2012 February – Sleipnir Lambrus – temporary installation, Ventura Lambrate, Milan, Italy
 2012 March – Huginn&Muninn Sauna– Piacenza, Italy
 2012 April – Bois de Boulon – Missoni, Milan, Italy
 2012 April – Lampada Flux III + HugMun II – Misiad Milano si Autoproduce, La Fabbrica del Vapore, Milan, Italy
 2012 May – Eva-sioni – Mostra, Palazzo Vernazza, Lecce, Apulia, Italy
 2012 June – Sleipnir Thermarum – Terme del Bacucco, Viterbo, Lazio, Italy
 2012 August – Sleipnir Automatum – Grythyttan, Sweden
 2012 November – Huginn, Turin, Italy
 2013 – Sleipnir Alea – temporary installation, ART.4, Fossano, Italy
 2013 – Sleipnir Volta – temporary installation, Streetscape2, Como, Italy
 2013 – Sleipnir Argus Junior – temporary installation, Trepponti di Comacchio, Commacchio, Italy
 2013 – Sleipnir Bok – Grythyttan, Sweden
 2013 – Sleipnir Argus – Casa Museo Remo Brindisi, Lido di Spina, Comacchio, Italy
 2013 – Sleipnir Drusi –  Free University of Bozen-Bolzano, Bolzano, South Tyrol, Italy
 2013 – Sleipnir Steam – Fabbrica del Vapore, Milan, Italy
 2013 – Castra Exemplorum – temporary installation, Fabbrica del Vapore, Milan, Italy
 2014 – Sleipnir Meano – Borgo dei Creativi, Meaño, Italy
 2014 – Sleipnir Tidonis – CArD, Pianello Val Tidone, Italy
 2014 – Sleipnir Cine – temporary installation at Open, Lido di Venezia, Italy
 2014 – Sleipnir Spiken II – Grythyttan, Sweden
 2014 – Sleipnir Park – temporary installation, Giardini Indro Montanelli, Milan, Italy
 2014 – Harpago Salis – temporary installation, Magazzini del Sale, Venice, Italy
 2014 – Sleipnir 1861 – temporary installation, Piazza Carignano, Turin, Italy
 2014 – Sleipnir Lúg – temporary installation, Lugano, Canton Ticino, Switzerland
 2015 – Turris Pythagorica – Södra Hyttan, Hjulsjo, Hällefors, Sweden
 2015 – Sleipnir Ciconiae – Stary Bubel, Poland
 2017 – Turris Pithagorica II 14891
 2017 – Yggdrasill Triennale 13217
 2017 – Finis Extra Munch 11279
 2018 – Birnam Wood IV 35677 – Palazzo Sebelloni, Milan, Italy
 2018 – Sleipnir XLVIII Laterna 27697 – Grythyttan, Sweden
 2018 – Sleipnir XLII Latemar 2797 – Respirart Sculpture Park, Trentino, Italy
 2018 – ArkiZoic Project II 7297 –  Spazio Giovannoni, Milan, Italy
 2020   – Finis Extra painting
 2021 – Dvlightship II
 2022 – Yggdrasill II Arcimboldi

References

1967 births
Living people
Italian people of Swedish descent
Polytechnic University of Milan alumni
Architects from Milan
21st-century Italian artists
21st-century Italian architects
Artists from Milan
20th-century Italian architects
20th-century Italian artists
Italian sculptors